In mathematics, specifically algebraic topology, Čech cohomology is a cohomology theory based on the intersection properties of open covers of a topological space. It is named for the mathematician Eduard Čech.

Motivation
Let X be a topological space, and let  be an open cover of X. Let  denote the nerve of the covering. The idea of Čech cohomology is that, for an open cover  consisting of sufficiently small open sets, the resulting simplicial complex  should be a good combinatorial model for the space X. For such a cover, the Čech cohomology of X is defined to be the simplicial cohomology of the nerve. This idea can be formalized by the notion of a good cover. However, a more general approach is to take the direct limit of the cohomology groups of the nerve over the system of all possible open covers of X, ordered by refinement. This is the approach adopted below.

Construction

Let X be a topological space, and let  be a presheaf of abelian groups on X. Let  be an open cover of X.

Simplex
This intersection is called the support of σ and is denoted |σ|.

Now let  be such a q-simplex. The j-th partial boundary of σ is defined to be the (q−1)-simplex obtained by removing the j-th set from σ, that is: 

The boundary of σ is defined as the alternating sum of the partial boundaries:

Cochain

Differential
The cochain groups can be made into a cochain complex  by defining the coboundary operator  by:

A calculation shows that 

The coboundary operator is analogous to the exterior derivative of De Rham cohomology, so it sometimes called 
the differential of the cochain complex.

Cocycle

Thus a (q−1)-cochain  is a cocycle if for all q-simplices  the cocycle condition 

 

holds. 

A 0-cocycle  is a collection of local sections of  satisfying a compatibility relation on every intersecting 

A 1-cocycle  satisfies for every non-empty  with

Coboundary

For example, a 1-cochain  is a 1-coboundary if there exists a 0-cochain  such that for every intersecting

Cohomology

Thus the qth Čech cohomology is given by

.

The Čech cohomology of X is defined by considering refinements of open covers. If  is a refinement of  then there is a map in cohomology  The open covers of X form a directed set under refinement, so the above map leads to a direct system of abelian groups.

The Čech cohomology of X with coefficients in a fixed abelian group A, denoted , is defined as  where  is the constant sheaf on X determined by A.

A variant of Čech cohomology, called numerable Čech cohomology, is defined as above, except that all open covers considered are required to be numerable: that is, there is a partition of unity {ρi} such that each support  is contained in some element of the cover. If X is paracompact and Hausdorff, then numerable Čech cohomology agrees with the usual Čech cohomology.

Relation to other cohomology theories

If X is homotopy equivalent to a CW complex, then the Čech cohomology  is naturally isomorphic to the singular cohomology . If X is a differentiable manifold, then  is also naturally isomorphic to the de Rham cohomology; the article on de Rham cohomology provides a brief review of this isomorphism. For less well-behaved spaces, Čech cohomology differs from singular cohomology. For example if X is the closed topologist's sine curve, then  whereas 

If X is compact Hausdorff, then Čech cohomology (with coefficients in a discrete group) is isomorphic to Alexander-Spanier cohomology.

For a presheaf  on X, let  denote its sheafification. Then we have a natural comparison map

from Čech cohomology to sheaf cohomology. If X is paracompact Hausdorff, then  is an isomorphism. More generally,  is an isomorphism whenever the Čech cohomology of all presheaves on X with zero sheafification vanishes.

In algebraic geometry
Čech cohomology can be defined more generally for objects in a site C endowed with a topology. This applies, for example, to the Zariski site or the etale site of a scheme X. The Čech cohomology with values in some sheaf  is defined as

where the colimit runs over all coverings (with respect to the chosen topology) of X. Here  is defined as above, except that the r-fold intersections of open subsets inside the ambient topological space are replaced by the r-fold fiber product

As in the classical situation of topological spaces, there is always a map

from Čech cohomology to sheaf cohomology. It is always an isomorphism in degrees n = 0 and 1, but may fail to be so in general. For the Zariski topology on a Noetherian separated scheme, Čech and sheaf cohomology agree for any quasi-coherent sheaf. For the étale topology, the two cohomologies agree for any étale sheaf on X, provided that any finite set of points of X are contained in some open affine subscheme. This is satisfied, for example, if X is quasi-projective over an affine scheme.

The possible difference between Čech cohomology and sheaf cohomology is a motivation for the use of hypercoverings: these are more general objects than the Čech nerve

A hypercovering K∗ of X is a certain simplicial object in C, i.e., a collection of objects Kn together with boundary and degeneracy maps. Applying a sheaf  to K∗ yields a simplicial abelian group  whose n-th cohomology group is denoted . Then, it can be shown that there is a canonical isomorphism

where the colimit now runs over all hypercoverings.

Examples 
Using the cover

we have the following modules from the cotangent sheaf

If we take the conventions that  then we get the Čech complex

References

Citation footnotes

General references 

 
 

Cohomology theories